Stokeclimsland was an electoral division of Cornwall in the United Kingdom which returned one member to sit on Cornwall Council between 2009 and 2021. It was abolished at the 2021 local elections, being succeeded by Altarnun and Stoke Climsland.

Councillors

Extent
Stokeclimsland represented the very west of the town of Launceston, the villages of South Petherwin, Lawhitton, Treburley, and Stoke Climsland, and the hamlets of Trewen, Piper's Pool, Trenault, Daw's House, Little Comfort, Larrick, Trebullett, Trekenner, Rezare, Woodabridge, Venterdon, Pempwell, Tutwell, Luckett, and Old Mill. The village of Tregadillett was shared with Launceston North and North Petherwin division, and the village of Bray Shop was shared with Lynher division. The division was nominally abolished during boundary changes at the 2013 election, but this had little effect on the ward. From 2009 to 2013, the division covered 9,355 hectares in total; after the boundary changes in 2013, it covered 8874 hectares.

Election results

2017 election

2013 election

2009 election

References

Electoral divisions of Cornwall Council